Ann Pornel is a Canadian sketch comedian, actress, and television host based in Toronto.

Pornel was born in the Philippines and immigrated to Canada with her family as a child. She grew up in the High Park area of Toronto.

Pornel got into sketch comedy as an undergraduate student in the sciences at the University of Toronto and seeking a non-academic outlet. She is a former member of The Sketchersons and performed in the troupe's weekly sketch show Sunday Night Live. She later joined The Second City and starred in the all-woman production She the People featuring Second City sketches written by and about women. In a review of the show for NOW Glenn Sumi called Pornel a "force of nature." She was named the 2017 Performer of the Year by My Entertainment World.

In 2021 she debuted alongside Alan Shane Lewis as the co-hosts of the fourth season of The Great Canadian Baking Show. A fashion enthusiast, Pornel collaborated with designer Vanessa Magic to come up with her wardrobe for the show. Prior to her co-hosting duties on the Baking Show, Pornel appeared in guest roles on the Baroness von Sketch Show and This Hour Has 22 Minutes.

Lewis and Pornel received a Canadian Screen Award nomination for Best Host or Presenter in a Factual or Reality/Competition Series at the 10th Canadian Screen Awards in 2022 for The Great Canadian Baking Show.

References

External links

21st-century Canadian comedians
Canadian sketch comedians
Living people
Filipino emigrants to Canada
Canadian television hosts
Year of birth missing (living people)
Comedians from Toronto
Canadian women comedians